Paul Geoffrey Geis (February 23, 1953 – October 30, 2019) was an American long-distance runner. He competed in the men's 5000 metres at the 1976 Summer Olympics.

University of Oregon 
His Sophomore year he transferred to the University of Oregon to further pursue his running career under Coach Bill Dellinger. His running accolades include being a part of the 1974 NCAA Champion Cross Country Team with Oregon, winning the 1974 NCAA 5000-meter title, and going on to become a 1976 5000-meter Olympic Finalist in Montreal.

His running career was known for his rivalry with Steve Prefontaine.

References

External links
 

1953 births
2019 deaths
Athletes (track and field) at the 1976 Summer Olympics
American male long-distance runners
Olympic track and field athletes of the United States
Track and field athletes from Houston
21st-century American people